Alan Tarbuck (born 10 October 1948) is an English former professional footballer who played as a winger for Everton, Crewe Alexandra, Chester, Preston North End, Shrewsbury Town, Rochdale, and Bangor City.

Honours
with Crewe Alexandra
Football League Fourth Division fourth-place promotion: 1967–68

References

1948 births
Living people
Footballers from Liverpool
English footballers
Association football wingers
Everton F.C. players
Crewe Alexandra F.C. players
Chester City F.C. players
Preston North End F.C. players
Shrewsbury Town F.C. players
Rochdale A.F.C. players
Bangor City F.C. players
English Football League players